This is a list of the popular tourist attractions in the United Arab Emirates, by Emirate, except for shared attractions, such as mountains shared by different emirates

Abu Dhabi 
 Central Region:
 Sheikh Zayed Mosque: founded by Sheikh Zayed bin Sultan Al Nahyan and competed in 2007, the Abu Dhabi mosque was constructed by the Italian company Impregilo using material from India, Italy, Germany, Morocco, Pakistan, Turkey, Malaysia, Iran, China, United Kingdom, New Zealand, Macedonia and United Arab Emirates.
A mixed commercial, residential, and leisure project is currently under construction on the island, due to be completed in 2020. 
 Qasr al-Hosn: the oldest stone building in the city 
 Louvre Abu Dhabi: an art museum associated with the historic Louvre in Paris. 
 Al Lulu Island: a  man-made island off the coast of Abu Dhabi island. It stretches from the Abu Dhabi Breakwater to the Zayed Sea Port. Land reclamation was completed in 1992. 
 Al-Bahr Tower: a mashrabiya-inspired development consisting of two 29-storey, –high towers. It is located at the intersection of Al Saada and Al Salam Streets.
 Emirates Palace Hotel: a five star luxury hotel.
 Emirates Park Zoo at Al-Bahiyah
 Ferrari World: One of the largest theme parks in Abu Dhabi. Live shows, rides, shopping & food are the main highlights of this place.
 Eastern Region:
 Al-Ain National Museum: a museum in the city of Al Ain, the oldest in the UAE, located next to the Eastern Fort. It is on the eastern side of Al Ain Oasis
 Western Region:
 The desert surrounding Liwa Oasis

Ajman 
 The Musfoot region: mountains and fertile valley southeast of Ajman city

Dubai 

 Ain Dubai: an observation wheel on Bluewaters Island, near the Dubai Marina in Dubai.
 Burj Al Arab: a luxury hotel located in Dubai. At , it is the fourth tallest hotel in the world, 
 Burj Khalifa: Spired  skyscraper with a viewing deck, restaurant, hotel and offices and  park. Tallest man-made structure in the world.
 Palm Jumeirah: The Palm Jumeirah is an artificial archipelago shaped like a palm tree, created using land reclamation by Nakheel which extends into the Persian Gulf.
 The Dubai Fountain: is the largest choreographed fountain system in the world set on the  man-made Burj Khalifa Lake
 Al Fahidi Fort and Dubai Museum: the main museum in Dubai is located in the Al Fahidi Fort, built in 1787.
 Dubai Creek : the U-shaped natural sea water space in Dubai which is a tourist spot for Dhow cruising, Shopping and Sight seeing.
 Global Village (Dubai) : Global Village Dubai combine the world 90 countries cultures at one place.

Fujairah 
 Al Badiyah Mosque: the oldest mosque in use in the UAE. Tourists are not allowed inside. 
 Fujairah Historic Fort: the oldest fort in the country. Built in 1670 and restored in the late 20th century
 Wadi Al-Wurayah: a Ramsar Wetland of International Importance, the  area is located between the towns of Masafi, Khor Fakkan and Bidiyah.

Ras al-Khaimah 
 Ru'us al-Jibal in the Musandam Peninsula
 Jebel Jais, the highest mountain in the UAE
 Jebel Yibir, the mountain with the highest peak in the UAE, due to the above mentioned mountain's peak being in Oman

Sharjah 
 Dhaid Fort
 Sharjah Museum of Islamic Civilization
 Sharjah Art Museum
 Sharjah Cricket Stadium
 Adventureland

Umm al-Quwain 
 Bird watching at Khor al-Beidah and Al-Sinniyah Island

Shared 
 The Western Hajar Mountains, which includes Jebel Jais in the Emirate of Ras Al Khaimah, and Jebel Hafeet (sensu lato) in the Emirate of Abu Dhabi, and mountains in the Emirates of Ajman of Fujairah, and are shared with Oman

See also 
 Tourism in the United Arab Emirates
 Lists of tourist attractions

References 

Tourism in the United Arab Emirates